Wiesentheid is a municipality in the district of Kitzingen in Bavaria in Germany.

History
It was first mentioned in 918 as "Wisenheida". Mediatization in 1806 brought the former county of Schönborn into the Grand Duchy of Würzburg, along with which it became part of the Kingdom of Bavaria in 1814. The Bavarian Municipal Edict of 17 May 1818 (Gemeindeedikt (de)) formed today's Wiesentheid.

Main sights
Count's Castle Wiesentheid
Kanzleistrasse – street with historic administrative buildings
Schlossparkanlage – castle garden (English)
catholic Church of Saint Maurice built by Balthasar Neumann
historic vicarage
historic town hall
crucifixion memorial built by Jacob van der Auvera
historic Mariensäule (memorial of Mother Mary)

Sister city
  Rouillac, Charente, France

Personalities 

 Johann Georg Fuchs von Dornheim, (1586–1633), prince-bishop of Bamberg, and fighters for the counter-reformation as well as ruthless sorcerers ("Hexenbrenner").
 Carl Stumpf (1848–1936), philosopher, psychologist and musicologist

References

External links
Official website
grammar school  Steigerwald Landschulheim Wiesentheid

Kitzingen (district)
Franconian Circle